Team Dukla Praha is a professional road bicycle racing women's team which participates in elite women's races.

Team roster

Major results
2019
Tage des Querfeldeinsports Ternitz Cyclo-cross, Nikola Bajgerová

National Champions

2018
 Czech Time Trial, Tereza Korvasova
 Czech Road Race, Jarmila Machačová
 Czech Track (Individual Pursuit), Lucie Hochmann Záleská
 Czech Track (Team Pursuit), Tereza Neumanová
 Czech Track (Team Pursuit), Katerina Kohoutkova
 Czech Track (Team Pursuit), Lucie Hochmann Záleská
 Czech Track (Team Pursuit), Jarmila Machačová
 Czech Track (Points race), Jarmila Machačová
 Czech Track (Madison), Katerina Kohoutkova
 Czech Track (Madison), Lucie Hochmann Záleská
 Czech Track (Omnium), Jarmila Machačová

2019
 Czech Time Trial, Tereza Korvasova
 Czech Road Race, Tereza Neumanová
 Czech Track (Omnium), Jarmila Machačová
 Czech Track (Points race), Petra Ševcíková
 Czech Junior Track (Omnium), Kristyna Burlova

2020
 Czech Road Race, Jarmila Machačová

2021
 Czech Track (Elimination race), Petra Ševcíková
 Czech Track (Omnium), Jarmila Machačová
 Czech Track (Madison), Katerina Kohoutkova
 Czech Track (Madison), Petra Ševcíková
 Czech Track (Points race), Jarmila Machačová
 Czech Track (Scratch race), Jarmila Machačová
 Czech Track (Individual pursuit), Jarmila Machačová

References

UCI Women's Teams
Cycling teams based in the Czech Republic
Cycling teams established in 2018